The term wardrobe is a metonym for the contents of a wardrobe, a freestanding piece of furniture that provides storage for clothing on pegs or shelves, in drawers or on rails, or a combination of those,  depending on how they are configured. A person's “wardrobe” includes every element of clothing worn, from the skin out. Historically, a bride's trousseau represented a new wardrobe with which to start her life as a married woman, which often meant a change in the way she dressed. Depending on the era, the place and the economic status of the bride, a trousseau was purchased or made new in anticipation of the wedding, or was acquired over the bride's lifetime, accumulated in a literal or figurative hope chest. 

In the 1933 film Dinner at Eight, Mrs. Jordan, a wealthy New York City socialite, complains vehemently to her daughter, who refuses to go shopping with her, that she is being married in a month and has "not a stitch of trousseau." 

In the performing arts, the wardrobe includes the actor's costumes, shoes, undergarments, hats and costume-related personal props such as gloves, jewelry, parasols, fans and pocket books. In theater, a wardrobe supervisor is responsible for supervising all wardrobe related activities during the course of a theatrical run. A wardrobe department in film or theatrical production employs costume designers and coordinators who clothe the performers.

See also
 Wardrobe stylist

References

Clothing